Louis de Breda Handley or Luigi de Breda (February 14, 1874 – December 28, 1956) was an Italian-born American freestyle swimmer and water polo player who competed in the 1904 Summer Olympics.

He was the son of the American sculptor Francis Montague Handleyand his Italian wife.  He was registered in Rome as an Italian citizen with the baptismal name of Luigi and the surname of his mother, "de Breda".

In 1896 he fled to New York and added to his name the surname of his father.  He worked in a small firm imports and devoted himself to his second passion after hunting, swimming.  He was also a great water polo player (his style of shooting was called "jumping salmon").

In the 1904 Olympics he won a gold medal in the 4x50 yard freestyle relay, and was a member of New York Athletic Club water polo team, which won a gold medal. He also competed in the one-mile freestyle but did not finish.

As a trainer, he led Ethelda Bleibtrey to three gold medals at the 1920 Olympics, and Gertrude Ederle to the first English Channel-crossing by a woman in 1926.

He wrote the entry dedicated to swimming on the Encyclopædia Britannica.

In 1976, he was inducted into the USA Water Polo Hall of Fame.

Publications 
 Handley, L. De. B., How to play water polo, American Sports Publishing Company, New York, 1910
 Handley, L. De. B., Swimming and Watermanship, The MacMillan Company, New York, 1918
Handley, L. De. B., Thirty Lessons in Swimming, The Milo Publishing Company, New York

See also
 List of members of the International Swimming Hall of Fame
 List of athletes with Olympic medals in different disciplines
 List of Olympic medalists in swimming (men)

References

External links
 
  Handley, l' italiano d' America 

1874 births
1956 deaths
American male freestyle swimmers
American male water polo players
Italian emigrants to the United States
Olympic gold medalists for the United States in swimming
Swimmers from Rome
Swimmers at the 1904 Summer Olympics
Water polo players at the 1904 Summer Olympics
Medalists at the 1904 Summer Olympics
Olympic gold medalists for the United States in water polo
American water polo coaches